Makoto Kaneko (金子 誠, born November 8, 1975) is a Japanese professional baseball player and manager. He is an infielder for the Hokkaido Nippon-Ham Fighters.

Kaneko won the Pacific League rookie of the year award in 1996. He won two golden glove awards at second base before being converted to shortstop.

He joined the Japanese olympic baseball team for the 2004 Summer Olympics, and won a bronze medal.

External links
 

1975 births
Living people
People from Abiko, Chiba
Nippon Professional Baseball infielders
Nippon Ham Fighters players
Hokkaido Nippon-Ham Fighters players
Baseball players at the 2004 Summer Olympics
Olympic bronze medalists for Japan
Olympic baseball players of Japan
Nippon Professional Baseball Rookie of the Year Award winners
Olympic medalists in baseball
Japanese baseball coaches
Nippon Professional Baseball coaches
Medalists at the 2004 Summer Olympics
Baseball people from Chiba Prefecture